KSA, formerly known as Korean Standards Association, ⁣ is a public organization under South Korea's Ministry of Trade, Industry and Energy (MOTIE). KSA was established in 1962 pursuant to Article 32 of the Industrial Standardization Act. The Chairman and CEO is Lee Sang-jin and at the end of the fiscal year 2017, sales were KRW 99.6 billion.

See also
Government
Economy of South Korea
Ministry of Trade, Industry and Energy
KATS and KASTO, other Korean standards associations

References

External links
 .
 Korea Accreditation Board

Standards organizations in South Korea
Certification marks
Product certification
ISO member bodies
Government agencies of South Korea
Government agencies established in 1962
1962 establishments in South Korea